The William Campbell House in Stamping Ground, Kentucky, also known as the Campbell-Gayle House, is an early house believed to have been built in c.1790-1800.  It was listed on the National Register of Historic Places in 1984.

It is notable as a "unique early house of brick nogging-filled half timber construction with a beaded clapboard-covered main facade and a steeply pitched roof."

The exterior of the brick nogging (infill between the timbers) is plastered with stucco while the timbers are not;  this is unusual as the only house in Kentucky known to have this feature.  The  by  house also has a steep roof and just one window each for the two front rooms.  The appearance of the house is much like historic Colonial dwellings in the eastern colonies.  The construction is thus dated to pioneer era and perhaps the 18th century.

References

National Register of Historic Places in Scott County, Kentucky
Houses completed in 1790
Houses in Scott County, Kentucky
Houses on the National Register of Historic Places in Kentucky
1790 establishments in Virginia
Pre-statehood history of Kentucky